Hadrian was a Roman Emperor of the 2nd century AD. The name may also refer to:
 Hadrian (TV programme), a 2008 BBC documentary about the travels of the Roman Emperor
 Hadrian (opera), a 2018 opera about the relationship between the Roman Emperor and Antinous
 The Waco CG-4 glider, named "Hadrian" in British service
 G-AAUE Hadrian, a named Handley Page H.P.42 airliner

See also
Adrian (disambiguation)
Hadran (disambiguation)
Hadria (disambiguation)